Cool FM is an Independent Local Radio station based in Newtownards, Northern Ireland. The station is owned and operated by Bauer and forms part of Bauer's Hits Radio Network.

The station began broadcasting in 1990 when its parent station Downtown Radio ceased simulcasting and split its AM and FM frequencies into two separate services. Initially broadcasting to the Greater Belfast area only, Cool FM can now be received across Northern Ireland on DAB.

As of December 2022, the station broadcasts to a weekly audience of 470,000, according to RAJAR.

Programming
Cool FM plays a broad mix of popular, youth-orientated Pop and Dance music. Some of the stations most popular shows are Pete Snodden in the Morning with Pete, Paulo and Rebeeca and the Cool Saturday Show with Stuart Robinson and Deputy Dave. Cool FM features some specialised music such as Cool of Rock on weekday mornings,  classic hits in The Cool Years on Sunday afternoons and Cool Goes Quiet,  love songs on SundayThursday nights.

Although station owner, Bauer Radio, packages Cool FM as part of the Hits Radio Network for selling advertising, Cool FM does not broadcast any Hits Radio networked programmes. All of Cool FM shows are locally-presented and produced from its Newtownards studios.

Local news bulletins air on the hour between 6am and 10pm every day. On weekdays, there are extended bulletins at 1pm and 5pm and headlines on the half hour during breakfast and drivetime.

Presenters

Paul Kennedy 1995 - today
Pete Snodden 2000 - today
DJ Hix 2007 - today
Stuart Robinson 2010 - today
Paulo Ross 2014 - today
John Kearns 1990-1995 / 2014 - today
Owen Beers 2014 - today
Rebecca McKinney 2015 - today
Deputy Dave 2015 - today
Melissa Riddell 2016 - today
Curtis McCosh 2016 - today
Connor Coates 2017 - today
Katharine Walker 2019 - today
Evanna Maxted 2021 - today
Ciara Ewing 2021 - today
Ryan A 2010-2014 / 2022 - today

References

External links
 

Bauer Radio
Mass media in County Down
Newtownards
Radio stations established in 1990
Radio stations in Northern Ireland
1990 establishments in Northern Ireland